Cañas is a district of the Cañas canton, in the Guanacaste province of Costa Rica.

Geography 
Cañas has an area of  km² and an elevation of  metres.

Villages
Administrative center of the district is the town of Cañas.

Other villages in the district are Albania, Ángeles, Cantarrana, Castillo, Cueva, Miravalles, San Cristóbal, San Martín, San Pedro, Unión. And their villages are Cedros, Cepo Concepción, Corobicí, Correntadas, Hotel, Jabilla Abajo, Jabilla Arriba, Libertad, Montes de Oro, Paso Lajas, Pueblo Nuevo, Sandillal, San Isidro (partly), Santa Lucía (partly) and Vergel.

Climate

Demographics 

For the 2011 census, Cañas had a population of  inhabitants.

Transportation

Road transportation 
The district is covered by the following road routes:
 National Route 1
 National Route 6
 National Route 142
 National Route 923
 National Route 925

References 

Districts of Guanacaste Province
Populated places in Guanacaste Province